Our Lady of Good Health ( Ārōkkiya annai), also known as Our Lady of Vailankanni, is a title given to the Blessed Virgin Mary by devotees. She is said to have appeared twice in the town of Velankanni, Tamil Nadu, India, in the 16th to 17th centuries.

History
Though there is no historical document or record about the apparitions of Mary at Velankanni, passed down through oral tradition from the 16th century. Also, the rescue of the Portuguese in Goa and Bombay-Bassein, who were who were sailing through a deadly storm, off the coast of the Coromandel region in the 17th century.

According to tradition, the first apparition is said to have occurred to a young boy delivering buttermilk to a man, who lived far away. During his travels, the boy stopped to rest beside a lake that was shaded by a Banyan tree. A beautiful woman, carrying a child, is said to have appeared, and asked the boy for some milk to feed her child, which he gave. When he reached the home for his milk delivery, he apologised for the delay and that there would be less milk in his pot. But when they opened the lid of the milk pot, the container was brimming with milk. 

The second apparition is alleged to have occurred a few years later. A lame boy would sell buttermilk to passing travellers, who would pause in the shade of a large Banyan tree, to escape the heat of the day. However, he had no customers. According to the account, suddenly, an ethereal woman, holding a child appeared before him, and asked for a cup of buttermilk. He gave her a cup, which she fed to her child. The woman asked the boy to go to Nagapattinam, and find a certain Catholic man in the town, and tell him to build a chapel at Vailankanni in her honour. Apparently cured, the boy ran to Nagapattinam, where he found the man and told him his story.  The Catholic men of Nagapattinam subsequently built a thatched chapel at Vailankanni, dedicated to Mary under the title of "Our Lady of Good Health". 
	
In the 17th century, a Portuguese merchant vessel sailing from Macau to Ceylon was caught in a severe storm in the Bay of Bengal. The sailors prayed fervently for  Mary, Star of the Sea to save them, and promised to build a church in her honor wherever they could land. The sea became calm, and their ship landed near Vailankanni on 8 September, the Feast of the Nativity of Mary. To honor their promise, the Portuguese rebuilt the thatched chapel into a stone church. The church was later renovated twice in the early 20th century.

Although these alleged apparitions have been formally approved by the Holy See, they were implicitly approved by Pope John XXIII's 1962 elevation of the Vailankanni church to minor basilica status. The Pope's apostolic brief noted that pilgrims in large numbers had been visiting the shrine for a long period of time, and that it was hailed as the "Lourdes of the East".

Basilica

 

A Gothic-styled basilica stands in Velankanni in memory of the apparitions. The basilica erected by the Portuguese and the Indians stands at the site where the buttermilk seller saw Mary and Jesus. The iconic depiction of the Madonna is unique in that it is one of two only icons where Mary is portrayed wearing an Indian Sari, while the other statue is said to have been buried with Aurangzeb, the Mughal Emperor. The basilica is known as a site for pilgrims from all over India and its assembly of multilingual prayers every Christmas.

Feast day
8 September, the Feast of the Nativity of Mary, is also commemorated as the feast of Our Lady of Good Health. The celebration starts on 29 August and ends on the day of the feast. The feast day prayers are said in Tamil, Marathi, East Indian, Malayalam, Telugu, Kannada, Konkani, Hindi and English.

Churches and shrines
The following churches and shrines in locations around the world are dedicated to Our Lady of Good Health.

Australia 
Shrine of Our Mother of Good Health - Velankanni, Bacchus Marsh, Victoria; All Nations Marian Centre, Merrimu, Australia
Shrine to Our Lady of Good Health, Vailankanni, at the Shrine of Our Lady Help of Christians, Brisbane, Australia
 Berrima Candle Chapel, Our Lady of Good Health, Vailankanni, at the Shrine of Our Lady of Mercy Penrose Park, New South Wales, Australia

Canada 
Our Lady of Good Health Parish Church, Ontario, Canada

India 

Basilica of Our Lady of Good Health, Velankanni-Lourdes of the East 

 St. Mary's Basilica, Bangalore, Shivajinagar, Bangalore, Karnataka, India

Annai Vailankanni Shrine, Besant Nagar, Chennai, Tamil Nadu, India

Basilica of Our Lady of Health, Harihar

Church of Our Lady of Vailankanni, Farla, Bantwal, Karnataka, India

Our Lady of Good Health Church, Pattumala, Kerala, India

 Our Lady of Velankanni Matha Shrine, Tuet, Kollam, Kerala, India

Annai Vailankanni Chapel, Pottery Town, Bangalore, Karnataka, India

Annai Velankanni Shrine, Anna Nagar, Madurai, Tamil Nadu

Our Lady of Vailankanni Church, Yelahanka, Bangalore, Karnataka, India

Our Lady of Good Health Church, Kottapattu, Tiruchirappalli, Tamil Nadu 
Our Lady of Good Health Church,  Periakulathupatty, Tiruchirappalli, Tamil Nadu, India

Our Lady of Good Health Church, Cuncolim, Goa, India

Shrine of Our Lady of Health, Khairatabad, Hyderabad, Telangana, India

Shrine of Our Lady of Vailankanni, Shamshabad, Hyderabad, Telangana, India

Arockia Matha Punya Kshethramu, Kadapa, Andhra Pradesh, India

Our Lady of Health Church, Shirva, India

Our Lady of Velankanni Shrine, at the Stella Maris Church, Kalmady, Udupi, India

 Church Of Our Lady Of Good Health Velankanni, at Vile Parle Mumbai, Maharashtra

Our Lady of Health Church, Mallapur, Karwar, Karnataka

Our Lady of Velankanni Church, Selvapuram, Coimbatore

Indonesia 
Graha Maria Annai Velangkanni, Medan, North Sumatra, Indonesia

Malaysia 
Chapel of Our Lady of Good Health, Kampung Pandan, Kuala Lumpur, Malaysia

Mozambique 
Igreja de Nossa Senhora da Saúde (Church of Our Lady of Good Health), Nampula, Mozambique

Portugal 
Santuário da Senhora da Saúde (Sanctuary of Our Lady of Good Health), Póvoa de Varzim, Portugal

South Africa 
Our Lady Of Vailankanni Catholic Church, Durban, South Africa*

Sri Lanka 
Annai Velankanni Church, Colombo, Sri Lanka
Our Lady of Good Health Church, Mabola, Sri Lanka
Our Lady of Good Health Church, Sedawatta, Wellampitiya, Sri Lanka

United States 
An oratory inside the Crypt Church at Basilica of the National Shrine of the Immaculate Conception, Washington, D.C., United States.

Movie
The Tamil language film Annai Velankanni was made in honor of Our Lady of Good Health with the title Annai Velankanni in 1971. It was directed by K. Thankappan, starring Gemini Ganesan, Kamal Haasan, K. R. Vijaya, Jayalalitha and Padmini.

Gallery

See also

Catholic Church in India
Velankanni Town
In Mexico and the Philippines, a different Our Lady of Health is venerated. This includes the Basílica de Nuestra Señora de la Salud in Pátzcuaro, Roman Catholic Archdiocese of Morelia, and a shrine at San Nicolas de Tolentino Parish Church (Quezon City).

References

External links
 Sanctuary of Our Lady of Vailankanni – Official website
 Marian Shrine of Vailankanni TV – Live streaming

Good Health
Christianity in Tamil Nadu
Titles of Mary
Catholic Church in India